"Rock and Roll Music" is a song written and recorded (in May 1957) by Chuck Berry. It has been widely covered and is one of Berry's most popular and enduring compositions.

"Rock and Roll Music" was a record chart hit for Berry, reaching the top 10 in the United States. The Beatles' 1964 recording topped singles charts in Europe and in Australia, and the Beach Boys had a U.S. top 10 hit with the song in 1976.

Original song 
The sessions for "Rock and Roll Music" took place in May 1957 in Chicago. The session was produced by Leonard Chess and Phil Chess. Backing Berry were Lafayette Leake (piano), Willie Dixon (bass), and Fred Below (drums).  Chess records issued the song as a single in September 1957 on both the 45 and 78 rpm formats. It reached number six on Billboard magazine's R&B Singles chart and number eight on Hot 100 chart before the year's end.

In 2004, Rolling Stone magazine ranked Berry's version number 128 on its list of the "500 Greatest Songs of All Time". The song is also included in the Rock and Roll Hall of Fame's list of the "500 Songs That Shaped Rock and Roll".

The Beatles version 

The Beatles performed the song in many of their early Hamburg shows, and also played it on the BBC program Pop Go The Beatles. In late 1964, exhausted from non-stop touring and recording and short of original material, they decided to record several of their old rock and rhythm and blues favorites to fill out their LP release Beatles for Sale.

John Lennon provided the vocal. In contrast to Berry's even-toned rendition, Lennon sang it as loudly and dynamically as his voice would permit. In the U.S., it was released on the LP Beatles '65. The song was part of the set list for the group's final tour in 1966; the performance from their show of June 30 at the Nippon Budokan was included in 1996's Anthology 2and was also performed during the Get Back/Let It Be Sessions in January 1969. It also served as the title song to the Beatles' 1976 compilation album Rock 'n' Roll Music.

Credits for the piano vary. The original Beatles for Sale liner notes, by Derek Taylor, state that "George Martin joins John and Paul on one piano", implying an overdub by all three that was added after the basic take. In the 1988 book The Complete Beatles Recording Sessions, Mark Lewisohn described the recording as a single take with no overdubs, with "all The Beatles on their familiar instruments" and Martin on piano.

In some countries, "Rock and Roll Music" was released as a single, with "I'm a Loser" as the B-side, in early 1965. It topped the charts in Norway, Sweden, Finland and Australia. The single peaked at number two in Germany and the Netherlands, and number three in Belgium.

Personnel
John Lennon – vocals, rhythm guitar, piano
Paul McCartney – bass guitar, piano
George Harrison – lead guitar
Ringo Starr – drums
George Martin – piano

The Beach Boys version 

The Beach Boys' version includes the use of backing vocals which repeat the phrase "Rock, roll, rockin' and roll". There is a difference between the LP version and the single version in that the single version has more synthesizer. Their version reached No. 5 on the US chart and No. 11 in Canada during the summer of 1976.

Personnel
Personnel per 2000 liner notes.
The Beach Boys
Al Jardine – backing vocals
Mike Love – backing vocals, lead vocals
Brian Wilson – backing vocals, arranger, piano, Moog bass, ARP synthesizer
Carl Wilson – backing vocals
Dennis Wilson – backing vocals, drums

Additional musicians and production staff

Album cover, art direction and logo was done by Dean Torrence and Jim Evans.

Charts 
Weekly charts

Year-end charts

Mental As Anything version 
Australian band Mental As Anything covered the song Rock and Roll Music. It was released as the first single from the bands seventh studio album Cyclone Raymond. The song was released on November 1988 and charted at number 5 on the Kent Music Report and it stayed on the chart for 22 weeks.

Track listings

Charts

References 

1957 songs
1965 singles
1976 singles
Chuck Berry songs
Bill Haley songs
Emerson, Lake & Palmer songs
Humble Pie (band) songs
Jan and Dean songs
Mental As Anything songs
1988 singles
CBS Records singles
Columbia Records singles
Epic Records singles
REO Speedwagon songs
The Beach Boys songs
The Beatles songs
Chess Records singles
Number-one singles in Australia
Number-one singles in Norway
Parlophone singles
Reprise Records singles
Song recordings produced by George Martin
Songs about rock music
Songs written by Chuck Berry